Tobias Abstreiter (born July 6, 1970) is a German former ice hockey centre. During his playing career he was described as a two-way player and a faceoff specialist.

Professional career
He started his career in 1987-88 with EV Landshut, playing there for six seasons until moving to EC Hedos München in 1993-94 and, in mid-season, to the Kölner Haie in 1994-95, playing on two consecutive championship teams. In 1997, he moved to TSV Erding for one season before transferring to the Kassel Huskies where he would go on to captain the team. In 2006-07, he left the Huskies to sign a two-year contract with the Straubing Tigers, where his younger brother, Peter, also played.

International career
Abstreiter has represented Germany on thirteen different occasions, both as a junior and as a professional. He has totalled five goals and seven assists in 26 games as a junior and four goals and 17 assists in 48 games as a professional. He last played professionally for Germany at the 2004 World Cup of Hockey, where he went scoreless in four games.Abstreiter played for Germany in a total of six World Championships. Furthermore, he participated in the 2002 Winter Olympics, finishing eighth in the tournament. Abstreiter was also the head coach of team Germany at the 2021 World Juniors. He led Germany to the quarter finals for the first time in history.

Career statistics

Regular season and playoffs

International

References

External links
 

1970 births
Living people
German ice hockey centres
Germany men's national ice hockey team coaches
Ice hockey players at the 2002 Winter Olympics
Kassel Huskies players
Kölner Haie players
EV Landshut players
Mad Dogs München players
Olympic ice hockey players of Germany
Sportspeople from Landshut
Straubing Tigers players